Damage Control (stylized as Damage CTRL) is a villainous professional wrestling stable composed of leader Bayley, Dakota Kai, & Iyo Sky currently performing in WWE on the Raw brand. Kai and Sky are former two-time WWE Women's Tag Team Champions.

History
At SummerSlam on July 30, 2022, Bayley returned after a year out of action due to injury, forming an alliance with the returning Dakota Kai and Io Shirai (now known as Iyo Sky, stylized in all caps) while confronting Bianca Belair after her Raw Women's Championship defense against Becky Lynch, resuming their feud and moving Bayley back to the Raw brand. Original plans according to Kai, was to have a stable consisting of herself, Tegan Nox and Candice LeRae. 

At Clash at the Castle, Bayley, Kai and Sky, now officially under the name Damage CTRL, defeated Belair, Alexa Bliss and Asuka. On the September 12 episode of Raw, Kai and Sky defeated Aliyah and Rodriguez to win the WWE Women's Tag Team Championship. Belair then began a rivalry with Bayley in which the champion would retain the Raw Women's Championship against Bayley at Extreme Rules in a ladder match, and at Crown Jewel in a Last Woman Standing match. Despite Kai and Sky losing the Women's Tag Team Championship to Alexa Bliss and Asuka after a 49-day reign, they reclaimed the titles at Crown Jewel 5 days later.

At Survivor Series WarGames, Damage CTRL competed in a WarGames match, teaming with Nikki Cross and Rhea Ripley against Belair, Bliss, Asuka, Mia Yim and a returning Becky Lynch, but lost when Lynch pinned Kai after a diving legdrop from the top of the cage through a table. On the December 16 episode of SmackDown, Kai and Sky retained their titles against Liv Morgan and Tegan Nox after interference from a masked individual, later revealed to be Xia Li.

Damage CTRL then began a feud with Becky Lynch, with Bayley winning a one-on-one match against Lynch on the December 19 episode of Raw. Two weeks later, Kai and Sky defeated Lynch and Michin in a non-title tag team match. A rematch between Lynch and Bayley was scheduled to take place at Raw is XXX but did not take place after Damage CTRL beat down Lynch before the match began. At the Royal Rumble, all three members of Damage CTRL entered the women's Royal Rumble match and scored five eliminations each, four of which were done as a team. Kai and Sky were eliminated by Becky Lynch, while Bayley was eliminated by Liv Morgan. The cage match was rescheduled for the February 6 episode of Raw after Lynch forced Bayley into accepting by physically threatening an injured Kai. Lynch won the match after Lita prevented Kai and Sky from interfering.

On the February 20 episode of Raw, Lynch and Lita challenged Kai and Sky for the titles, which Bayley accepted on their behalf. The following week, despite interference from Bayley, Kai and Sky lost the tag titles to Lynch and Lita after interference from the returning Trish Stratus, ending their second reign at 114 days. The following week, Lynch, Lita and Stratus challenged Damage CTRL to a six-woman tag team match at WrestleMania 39, which Bayley accepted.

Championships and accomplishments
 Slam Wrestling Awards
 Best WWE Tag Female (2022)
WWE
WWE Women's Tag Team Championship (2 times) – Kai and Sky

References

External links
 
 
 

WWE teams and stables
Women's wrestling teams and stables